Gaston School may refer to:

 Gaston School (Gaston, North Carolina), National Register of Historic Places listings in Northampton County, North Carolina
 The Gaston School, a school in Joinerville, Texas